The Hollywood Wolves were a Los Angeles-based minor-league hockey team that played in the Southern California Hockey League (1941–1944) and the Pacific Coast Hockey League (1944–1950). The team defeated the Boston Olympics in 1944 for the championship of the Amateur Hockey Association of the United States, the first team to hold an American national championship in hockey.

The Wolves were the Toronto Maple Leafs' minor league affiliate from 1944 until 1947, and shared an arena with the PCHL's Los Angeles Monarchs.

Notable players
 "Cowboy" Tom Anderson, Scottish-born defenceman won the NHL's Hart Trophy as the league's MVP in 1941-42 and later finished his career with the Wolves
 Bill Barilko, scored game-winning overtime goal in 1951 Stanley Cup Final for the Toronto Maple Leafs
 Bob Gracie, played 378 games in the National Hockey League from 1930 to 1939
 Ivan "Ching" Johnson, played over 400 games over twelve seasons with the New York Rangers
 Eric "Doc" Prentice, played five games with the Toronto Maple Leafs

References

Defunct ice hockey teams in the United States
Defunct sports teams in California
Ice hockey teams in Los Angeles
Ice hockey clubs established in 1942
Ice hockey clubs disestablished in 1947
1942 establishments in California
1947 disestablishments in California